The Bourbons of India are an Indian family who claim to be legitimate heirs of the House of Bourbon, descended from Jean Philippe de Bourbon, Count of Clermont-en-Beauvaisis, an exiled French noble who served in Mughal Emperor Akbar's court. The family is also known as the House of Bourbon-Bhopal, a name derived from the city of Bhopal in central India where their last few generations resided and worked in the pre-independent Indian Bhopal State Royal Court.

History
Traveller and photographer Louis Rousselet wrote in Le Fils du Connétable  when he had visited Isabella de Bourbon, known in the Court as Bourbon Sirdar, and got struck by her "European type". This is his account of his surprise to find a Bourbon Princess in Bhopal:

Kincaid's account of Jean de Bourbon's exile and settlement in India reads:

The family held the position of Governor of the Imperial Seraglio until the fall of Delhi after the invasion of Nader Shah in 1739 when Francis II (1718-1778) moved to their principality of Shergar to be the last Raja of Shergar. He was attacked by the troops of the Raja of Narwar in 1778 (General Sir John Malcolm 1823) and died alongside most of the family . His surviving son Salvadore II and his two sons moved to Gwalior and finally to Bhopal.

All the members of the Bourbons of Bhopal were known at the Bhopal Court by Muslim names. They were the most influential and wealthiest family in Bhopal, second only to the royal family themselves. The most prominent members of the family were Balthazar of Bourbon- Shazad Masih (1772-1829), son of Salvadore II. He became prime minister in 1820 until he was poisoned by Afghan nobles in 1829. Masih married an English lady, Isabella Johnston, the princess that French traveler Rousellet met. Their son, Sebastian of Bourbon-Mehrban Masih (1830-1878) was appointed prime minister (1857) to the Begums and built one of the most beautiful palaces in Bhopal, the Shaukat Mahal, and the Catholic Church of Bhopal, on land bequeathed by his mother Princess Isabella (died 1852). Eventually, the family fell out of favour during the last two reigns.

After Indian independence, the new Indian state abolished the old jagirs (land entitlements) in 1948, and royal and noble status in 1971. Deprived of any privileges, the family joined the ranks of the working bourgeoisie.
The Bourbons of Bhopal are certain that their direct ancestor Jean Phillipe was the secret son of the Constable of France and his wife Duchess Suzanne, according to family oral traditions. Though there are no records of Jean Phillipe of Bourbon in official family genealogy of the House of Bourbon, Prince Michael of Greece, in his book Le Rajah Bourbon (Michel de Grece 2007) gives a very plausible explanation to this and he does believe this branch of the Bourbons to be the oldest branch of the family. There are other different accounts of Jean de Bourbon's possible lineage.  One has the constable survive the sack of Rome and eventually marry a Mughal princess named Alaïque, Jean Philippe's mother. Another possible candidate is a member of the Bourbon-Busset branch, reported lost at sea in 1580, though the dates do not match.

Balthazar Napoleon IV de Bourbon, the current head of the family of Bourbons in India, is the son of Salvadore de Bourbon (1917–1978), who claimed the lineage in his memoir Les Bourbons de l'Inde,  which was edited by Lucien Jailloux and published posthumously with a preface written by historian of India and member of L'École Française d'Extrème-Orient Jean Deloche.

Salvadore de Bourbon's work is based upon nineteenth-century articles by people such as Claude Sosthène Grasset d'Orcet writing in La Revue britannique , Gabriel Ferrand writing in La Revue de Paris , and Colonel William Kincaid's Historical sketch of the Indian Bourbon family . The story goes that Jean Phillippe (simply "Jean de Bourbon" in some accounts), the secret son of Charles de Bourbon, Duke of Bourbon, the so-called "Constable of Bourbon", arrived in the court of Mughal emperor Akbar in 1560, relating a tale of his journey there that included pirates, kidnapping, and an attempt to sell him in a slave market in Cairo. Prince Michael of Greece has incorporated this into a historical novel, Le Rajah Bourbon , whose publication spurred a renewed interest in this claim to the French throne.

Claim to the Throne of France
The current head of the Bourbon-Bhopal family is Balthazar Napoleon IV de Bourbon, a lawyer by profession. De Bourbon's claim of link to the Bourbons of France was endorsed by Prince Michael of Greece in his historical novel, Le Rajah Bourbon . The novel, described as "an amalgam of conjecture and research", offers a speculative biography of De Bourbon's purported ancestor Jean Philippe de Bourbon. According to the novel, Jean Philippe was a nephew of King Henry IV, which would technically make Balthazar Napoleon the eldest in line to the French Throne. The author states that he completely believes in his theory, although he does not have absolute proof of it.

In 2008, Prince Michael favoured a DNA test, "perhaps from a surviving lock of Bourbon hair", to verify De Bourbon's claim of kinship. De Bourbon stated that he was ready to undergo the DNA test, but that he wanted to know "if the original samples will be available for matching since there were frequent inter-marriages among European royal families."

See also
 House of Bourbon
 Balthazar Napoleon IV de Bourbon, head of the Indian branch of the family from India.
 List of heirs to the French throne

References

Bibliography

Further reading

Fiction

Non-fiction 
 
 
 
 
 
 
 
 
 
 
 
 Also published as:

External links
 The Royal House of Bourbon in India
 Genealogy: The Family Tree of the Bourbons of India and the Bourbons of France
 
 Found in India the last king of France, 2 March 2007, The Guardian
 The next King of France? An Indian!, 21 August 2007, Manchester Evening News
 Bourbon of Indian vintage, 10 January 2008, Los Angeles Times

Genealogies
 https://web.archive.org/web/20021001143022/http://archiver.rootsweb.com/th/read/GEN-MEDIEVAL/1998-02/0886979312
 
 http://genroy.free.fr/bourbon.html

House of Bourbon (Spain)
People from Bhopal
Pretenders to the French throne